Erwan Bergot (27 January 19301 May 1993) was a French Army officer and author; he served in the French Army during the First Indochina War and Algerian War.

Biography
Born to a Breton family in Bordeaux, Erwan Bergot volunteered to serve in Indochina after completing his mandatory military service in 1951. He served in the 6th Colonial Parachute Battalion under Major Marcel Bigeard, after that he commanded the heavy mortar company of the 1st Foreign Parachute Battalion at the Battle of Dien Bien Phu. He was taken prisoner and experienced the hell of the Viet Minh internment camps; he was among the few that survived. In 1955, Bergot was recalled to serve in Algeria in the 2nd Foreign Parachute Regiment and 11e Choc. He was seriously wounded in his right eye during a clash at Constantine in 1961, leaving the frontline to write and report.

He became the first editor of the magazine of the French Army in 1962, writing his first book in 1964, Deuxième classe à Dien-Bien-Phu, which achieved immediate success. He then dedicated himself completely to writing, which resulted in around fifty books and additional notoriety. He received numerous literary awards including the prize of the Académie française and the Claude Farrère prize. The French Army annually awards an Erwan Bergot prize.

Bibliography 
 Deuxième classe à Dien-Bien-Phu, La table ronde, 1964
 Mourir au Laos, France-empire, 1965
 Les petits soleils, France-empire, 1967
 Prenez-les vivants, Balland, 1972
 La Légion, Balland, 1972
 L'Afrikakorps, Balland, 1972
 Vandenberghe, le pirate du delta, Balland, 1973
 Les héros oubliés, Grasset, 1975
 La Légion au combat, Narvik, Bir-Hakeim, Dièn Bièn Phu, Presses de la cité, 1975
 Le dossier rouge, services secrets contre FLN, Grasset, 1976
 L'homme de Prague, Presses de la cité, 1975
 Bataillon Bigeard, Indochine 1952-1954, Algérie 1955-1957, Presses de la cité, 1976
 Les Cadets de la France Libre, Presses de la cité, 1978 
 Commandos de choc en Indochine, les héros oubliés, Grasset, 1979
 Les 170 jours de Dien Bien Phu, Presses de la cité, 1979
 La 2e D.B., Presses de la Cité, 1980
 La guerre des appelés en Algérie 1956-1962, Presses de la cité, 1980
 Les sentiers de la guerre (fiction)
 V.1 : Les sentiers de la guerre, Presses de la Cité, 1981
 V.2 : Frères d'ames, Presses de la Cité, 1982
 V.3 : Le flambeau, Presses de la Cité, 1983
 La Coloniale du Rif au Tchad, 1925-1980, Presses de la Cité, 1982
 Bataillon de Corée, les Volontaires Français, 1950-1953, Presses de la Cité, 1983
 Le régiment de marche de la Légion, Presses de la Cité, 1984
 L'héritage, Presses de la Cité, 1985
 Gendarmes au combat, Indochine 1945-1955, Presses de la Cité, 1985
 11e Choc, Presses de la cité, 1986
 Convoi 42, la marche à la mort des prisonniers de Dien Bien Phu, Presses de la Cité, 1986
 La bataille de Dong Khê, la tragédie de la R.C.4, Indochine, mai-octobre 1950, Presses de la cité, 1987
 Bigeard, Perrin, 1988
 Bir Hakeim : février-juin 1942, Presses de la Cité, Paris, 1989
 Sud lointain (fiction)
 V.1 : Le courrier de Saïgon, Presses de la Cité, 1990 
 V.2 : La Rivière des Parfums, Presses de la Cité, 1990 
 V.3 : Le maître de Baotan, Presses de la Cité, 1991
 Indochine 1951, l'Année de Lattre, une Année de Victoires
 Opération Daguet, Presses de la cité, 1991 (with Alain Gandy)
 Les Paras

1930 births
1993 deaths
Writers from Bordeaux
French military personnel of the First Indochina War
French military personnel of the Algerian War
20th-century French non-fiction writers
20th-century French male writers
French people of Breton descent
Military personnel from Bordeaux